Dorsum Cushman is a wrinkle ridge at  in Mare Fecunditatis on the Moon. It is 86 km long and was named after American micropaleontologist Joseph Augustine Cushman in 1976.

References

Cushman